Spirit of the Moment – Live at the Village Vanguard is a 1995 live album by jazz saxophonist Joshua Redman, released by Warner Bros. Records (9362-45923-2).

Reception 
The AllMusic reviewer Scott Yanow awarded the album 4.5 stars. He recommends the album and points out that we get a definitive look at how the tenor saxophonist Joshua Redman sounded in the mid 1990s by listening to it. Redman is joined by Peter Martin (piano), Christopher James Thomas (bass), and Brian Blade (drums), and they are showing off both a wide range and lyricism stretching from Gene Ammons (saluted on "Jig-a-Jug") to late John Coltrane. Jeff Simon of The Buffalo News commented, "Redman is still a wonderful musician, even more grounded in swing-era basics than Carter (listen to his balladry on "Neverend"). So, too, is he unpredictable, if not nearly as brilliant, driven and limitlessly surprising as Carter."

Track listing

Personnel
Musicians
 Joshua Redman – saxophone
 Peter Martin – piano
 Christopher James Thomas – double bass
 Brian Blade – drums

References

External links
 

Joshua Redman albums
1995 live albums
Albums recorded at the Village Vanguard
Albums produced by Matt Pierson